Kashkin may refer to
Darreh Kashkin, a village in Iran 
Nikolay Kashkin (1839–1920), Russian music critic 
Ivan Kashkin (1899–1963), Russian-Soviet translator of English literature